May 2014 Nigeria bombings may refer to:

2014 Jos bombings
May 2014 Nyanya bombing